Gezeli or Gazli may refer to:
 Gezeli-ye Sofla

See also
 Gazli (disambiguation)